Lisle-sur-Tarn is a commune in the Tarn department in southern France.

Geography 
The city is located halfway between Toulouse and Albi on the A68 motorway, in the Gaillac vineyard, on the banks of the Tarn. Historically speaking, it is also located on one of the ancient Ways of St. James.

History 
Created as a  bastide by Raymond VII, Count of Toulouse in the 13th century, after the destruction of the castle of Montagut, ordered by the crusaders during the Albigensian Crusade. Thanks to local productions such as pastel and Gaillac wine, the city became an important market with a fluvial port on the Tarn. This extensive heritage, in a region that is still producing wine nowadays, plays an important role in the local tourism-oriented economy.

Demography

Transport 

Lisle-sur-Tarn station has rail connections to Toulouse, Aurillac, Albi and Rodez.

Notable facts 

The village was designed with perpendicular, regularized streets with red-brick half-timbered houses, that are made up of an ensemble of four districts, each one delimited by a fortified gate. The market square is the largest of all the south-western bastides, with about 5,000 m2. It was renovated in 2000. The town has a museum on the main square to the artist Raymond Lafage.

Trivia 
The town figures in Tracy Chevalier's novel The Virgin Blue.

See also 
 Communes of the Tarn department
 Sivens Dam
 Tourism in Tarn

References 

Communes of Tarn (department)